Raw Blues Power is a 2002 collaborative blues rock album by guitarist Paul Gilbert and his uncle Jimi Kidd.

Track listing

Musicians
 Paul Gilbert – guitar, vocals
 Jimi Kidd – guitar, vocals
 Jeff Martin – bongos, vocals
 Mike Szuter – bass guitar, vocals
 Johnny Fedevich – drums, vocals

Production
 Steve Hall – mastering
 Harry Freemantle – art direction
 Kate Gilbert – photography

References

2002 albums